The South American Pacific mangroves, or Panama Bight mangroves, is an ecoregion along the Pacific coast of Panama, Colombia, Ecuador and Peru.

Geography

Location

The South American Pacific mangroves ecoregion is found along the southern coast of Panama, extensive stretches of the Pacific coast of Colombia, sections of the Pacific coast of Ecuador, particularly around the estuary of the Guayas River, and in two small stretches along the northern coast of Peru.

The Panama Bight Mangroves, a Global ecoregion, consists of the Gulf of Panama mangroves, Esmeraldas–Pacific Colombia mangroves, Manabí mangroves and Gulf of Guayaquil–Tumbes mangroves.
The Gulf of Panama mangroves (NT1414) extend from the Gulf of Parita to the Bay of San Miguel.
Mangroves are found along the coasts of Colombia and Ecuador from the Gulf of Tribugá in the north to Mompiche Bay in the south (NT1409).
Mangroves are found along the coast of Manabí Province in Ecuador (NT1418).
They are also found between Ecuador and Peru where many rivers empty into the Pacific and the Gulf of Guayaquil (NT1413).

In Panama the mangroves are found along the Pacific coast of the Panamanian dry forests and Isthmian-Atlantic moist forests ecoregions.
Further south in Colombia the mangroves fringe the Chocó–Darién moist forests along the Pacific coast.
Further south again, in Ecuador the mangroves fringe sections of the coast of the Western Ecuador moist forests, Ecuadorian dry forests and Tumbes–Piura dry forests, which extend into Peru.
There is a small section of mangroves on the northern coast of the Sechura Desert.

Terrain

The mangroves of the Pacific coast deltas of South American are fed by streams with steep slopes in their catchment areas, which have high levels of rainfall.
These streams carry high loads of sediment. 
The fresh sediments should therefore maintain the surface elevation of the mangroves.

Climate

Rainfall may exceed  annually on the northern Pacific coast of Colombia, and the rivers discharge high volumes of water.
Destructive tropical cyclones are very rare, so the mangroves avoid both the destructive effects of storms and the benefits from deposits of marine sediment.
At a sample location at coordinates  the Köppen climate classification is Af (equatorial; fully humid).

Ecology

The ecoregion is in the Neotropical realm, in the mangroves biome.
Mangroves extend along the Pacific coast south to 5°32' at the estuary of the Piura River in the north of Peru.
South of that the cold Humboldt Current causes high soil salinity and very arid conditions, with hardly any fresh water streams.
This is an inhospitable environment for mangroves, particularly during El Niño years.

Flora

49 families of vascular plants have been identified in the Pacific coast mangroves, with 135 genera and 222 species.
A 2014 book proposed a distinction between the Chocoan and Equatorial-Pacific mangrove forests.
Endemic species such as Avicennia tonduzi and Avicennia bicolor are found in the Pacific mangroves.
More than 70% of Colombia's mangroves grow on the Pacific coast.
The southernmost stands of mangroves in the Virrila and Piura estuaries hold only black mangroves (Avicennia germinans).
Between 1987 and 2014 these stands have grown substantially, but have not spread along the coast.

Fauna

Endangered birds include the white-winged guan (Penelope albipennis).
Endangered mammals include the black-headed spider monkey (Ateles fusciceps), Geoffroy's spider monkey (Ateles geoffroyi) and equatorial dog-faced bat (Molossops aequatorianus). 
Endangered reptiles include the green sea turtle (Chelonia mydas) and hawksbill sea turtle (Eretmochelys imbricata).

Status

Since then the mangroves have been slowly recovering, and seem stable.
Part of the ecoregion is protected by the Barro Colorado Island Natural Monument.

Notes

Sources

Mangrove ecoregions
Ecoregions of Panama
Ecoregions of Colombia
Ecoregions of Ecuador
Ecoregions of Peru
Colombian coasts of the Pacific Ocean
Panamanian coasts of the Pacific Ocean
Gulf of Panama
Neotropical ecoregions
Tropical Eastern Pacific